Arafat Djako (born 10 November 1988) is a Togolese former professional footballer.

Club career
Djako began his career in the youth from AC Merlan, was in Winter 2007 promoted to the first team, here played between 1 July 2008 than joined to Ghanaian top club Ashanti Gold S.C., In 2009, he joined the Israeli club of Bnei Sakhnin at the end of that season he sold to another Israeli club Hapoel Acre.

On 8 September 2012, it was announced that Djako had joined Inter Baku on a free transfer.

On 19 March 2014, Djako signed for Dacia Chișinău on a two-year contract after a short trial period.

International career
Djako played his debut for the Togo national team on 10 September 2008 against Zambia and his second call up was on 28 March 2009 for the game against Cameroon in the Qualification for the 2010 FIFA World Cup.

References

External links

1988 births
Living people
Sportspeople from Lomé
Togolese footballers
Association football forwards
Togo international footballers
Israeli Premier League players
Russian Premier League players
Süper Lig players
Qatar Stars League players
Azerbaijan Premier League players
Ethiopian Premier League players
AC Merlan players
Ashanti Gold SC players
Bnei Sakhnin F.C. players
FC Anzhi Makhachkala players
Hapoel Acre F.C. players
Gaziantepspor footballers
Al-Arabi SC (Qatar) players
Shamakhi FK players
FC Dacia Chișinău players
CF Mounana players
Bahir Dar Kenema F.C. players
Sebeta City F.C. players
Togolese expatriate footballers
Togolese expatriate sportspeople in Ghana
Expatriate footballers in Ghana
Togolese expatriate sportspeople in Israel
Expatriate footballers in Israel
Togolese expatriate sportspeople in Russia
Expatriate footballers in Russia
Togolese expatriate sportspeople in Turkey
Expatriate footballers in Turkey
Togolese expatriate sportspeople in Qatar
Expatriate footballers in Qatar
Togolese expatriate sportspeople in Azerbaijan
Expatriate footballers in Azerbaijan
Togolese expatriate sportspeople in Moldova
Expatriate footballers in Moldova
Togolese expatriate sportspeople in Gabon
Expatriate footballers in Gabon
Togolese expatriate sportspeople in Ethiopia
Expatriate footballers in Ethiopia
21st-century Togolese people